Thomas Barron may refer to:

Thomas Barron (trade unionist) (1873–1943), British trade unionist
T. A. Barron (Thomas Archibald Barron, born 1952), American author

See also
Thomas Baron (disambiguation)
Thomas Barron House